Charles Moreau (born 11 April 1982) is a Canadian Paralympic cyclist who competes at international elite cycling competitions. He is a double Paralympic and Parapan American Games bronze medalist in road cycling.

Accident
On 20 January 2008, Moreau was involved in a serious car accident. His car broke down on a bridge near Trois-Rivières, he waited for a tow truck to recover his vehicle. Ten minutes later, a truck collided into his car and left him paralysed from the waist down. Moreau tried out paratriathlon and won a silver medal at the 2009 World Championships and three fourth-place positions in other world triathlon championships, he switched to cycling and has won numerous medals and victories at four World Cups since 2015.

References

External links
 
 

1982 births
Living people
People from Victoriaville
Cyclists from Quebec
Paralympic cyclists of Canada
Paratriathletes of Canada
Canadian male cyclists
Canadian male triathletes
Cyclists at the 2016 Summer Paralympics
Cyclists at the 2020 Summer Paralympics
Medalists at the 2016 Summer Paralympics
Medalists at the 2015 Parapan American Games
20th-century Canadian people
21st-century Canadian people